Brander Township is a civil township in Bottineau County in the U.S. state of North Dakota. As of the 2010 census, its population was 54.

References

Mayor, 1994-current: Dylan Stratton

Townships in Bottineau County, North Dakota
Townships in North Dakota